Tornimparte is a comune and town in the province of L'Aquila in the Abruzzo region of central-southern Italy.

Geography
Tornimparte is subdivided into 23 wards (frazioni): Castiglione, Capo La Villa, Villagrande, Capolitto, Case Tirante, Piè la Villa, Piagge, Pianelle, Colle San Vito, Colle Santa Maria, Barano, San Nicola, Colle Massimo, Colle Perdonesco, Viaro, Molino di Salomone, Pié La Costa, Colle Castagno, Collefarelli, Colle Fiascone, Forcelle, Palombaia, Rocca Santo Stefano.
Villagrande is the principal town and it is the administrative seat of the municipality.

Transport 
Tornimparte has a station on the Terni–Sulmona railway, with trains to Terni, Rieti and L'Aquila.

References